Bo Phak is a subdistrict in the Chat Trakan District of Phitsanulok Province, Thailand.

Geography
Bo Phak lies in the Nan Basin, which is part of the Chao Phraya Watershed.

Administration
The following is a list of the subdistrict's muban, which roughly correspond to the villages:

Temples
The following is a list of active Buddhist temples in Bo Phak:
Wat Nathon in Ban Nathon
Wat Kwat Nam Man in Ban Kwat Nam Man
Wat Bo Phak in Ban Bo Phak

References

Tambon of Phitsanulok province
Populated places in Phitsanulok province